The Ginn sur Mer Classic was a PGA Tour golf tournament held in Florida that lasted for two years, 2007 and 2008.

It was announced in June 2007 as a replacement for the Running Horse Golf Championship, another proposed new tournament that collapsed before its first outing. The PGA Tour and Ginn Resorts had agreed to a five-year deal under which the tournament would be played at several Ginn Resorts properties. After several tournaments played in Florida, the plan was to eventually relocate it to the Ginn Sur Mer resort then under construction on Grand Bahama island in The Bahamas. The Ginn sur Mer Classic was a PGA Tour Fall Series event.

In 2007, the tournament was played at Tesoro Club in Port St. Lucie, Florida. Daniel Chopra won the event, and the total purse was US$4,500,000.

In 2008, The Conservatory Course at Ginn Hammock Beach Resort in Palm Coast, Florida hosted the event. The purse was $4,600,000. The 2008 tournament was won by Ryan Palmer in wet, windy, rainy conditions, after he made a ten foot birdie putt on the final hole.

Due to financial problems of the title sponsor, the tournament was cancelled after the 2008 PGA Tour season.

Winners

References

External links
Coverage on the PGA Tour's official site
Launch announcement
2008 tournament location

Former PGA Tour events
Golf in Florida
Palm Coast, Florida
Recurring sporting events established in 2007
Recurring sporting events disestablished in 2008
2007 establishments in Florida
2008 disestablishments in Florida